The 2005 FIBA Europe Under-16 Championship for Women Division B was the second edition of the Division B of the European basketball championship for women's national under-16 teams. It was played in Tallinn, Estonia, from 22 to 31 July 2005. Slovakia women's national under-16 basketball team won the tournament.

Participating teams

  (16th place, 2004 FIBA Europe Under-16 Championship for Women Division A)

  (15th place, 2004 FIBA Europe Under-16 Championship for Women Division A)

Preliminary round
In the Preliminary round, the teams were drawn into four groups of four. The first two teams from each group advance to the Quarterfinal round (Groups E and F), while the third and fourth teams advance to the Classification round (Groups G and H).

Group A

Group B

Group C

Group D

Quarterfinal round
In the Quarterfinal round, the teams play in two groups of four. The first two teams from each group advance to the Semifinals; the other teams advance to the 5th–8th place playoffs.

Group E

Group F

Classification round
In the Classification round, the teams play in two groups of four. The first two teams from each group advance to the 9th–12th place playoffs; the other teams advance to the 13th–16th place playoffs.

Group G

Group H

13th–16th place playoffs

13th–16th place semifinals

15th place match

13th place match

9th–12th place playoffs

9th–12th place semifinals

11th place match

9th place match

5th–8th place playoffs

5th–8th place semifinals

7th place match

5th place match

Championship playoffs

Semifinals

3rd place match

Final

Final standings

References

2005
2005–06 in European women's basketball
International youth basketball competitions hosted by Estonia
FIBA U16
July 2005 sports events in Europe